The fundamental plane may refer to:

 Fundamental plane (spherical coordinates), which divides a spherical coordinate system
 Fundamental plane (elliptical galaxies), which shows an empirical relationship among mean surface brightness, velocity dispersion and effective radius of an elliptical galaxy